Mauro Sánchez Navarro (born 3 October 1994 in Mexico City, Mexico) is a Mexican actor; best known for his role of Nico in the Mexican film This Is Not Berlin, film for which he won as Best Supporting Actor at the 2019 Málaga Spanish Film Festival. Despite having made himself known as an actor in the cinema, Sánchez Navarro has appeared on television in recurring roles in several Mexican telenovelas.

Filmography

Film roles

Television roles

Awards and nominations

References

External links 
 

Living people
Mexican male telenovela actors
Mexican male film actors
Mexican male television actors
21st-century Mexican male actors
1994 births